Hector Salisbury Highton (December 10, 1923 – September 28, 1985) was a Canadian professional ice hockey goaltender who played twenty-four games in the National Hockey League with the Chicago Black Hawks during the 1943–44 NHL season. On January 7, 1944, he was sent to the Providence Reds of the American Hockey League with Gord Buttrey and $10,000 for goaltender Mike Karakas. He retired in 1951 after a stint with the Pacific Coast Hockey League.

External links

1923 births
1985 deaths
Canadian ice hockey goaltenders
Chicago Blackhawks players
Ice hockey people from Alberta
Sportspeople from Medicine Hat
Canadian expatriates in the United States